Kildimo-Pallaskenry GAA is a Gaelic Athletic Association club located in Pallaskenry, County Limerick, Ireland.  It was founded in 1906 and the following are some significant dates from its history:

History and achievements
1906 Pallaskenry affiliated to County Board.
1912 County Junior hurling final against Claughaun, played in 1914 in Markets Field, Pallaskenry lost 3-2 to 2-3
1916 Joined with Kildimo.
1920 Parted from Kildimo.
1936 West Junior A hurling final against Knockaderry. Pallaskenry lost 7-5 to 1-3.
1950 Joined Kildimo.
1951 Pallaskenry field opened and blessed.
1953 Kildimo/Pallaskenry enter City Division.
1953 Kildimo/Pallaskenry lost City Junior hurling final to the Mental Hospital (the Mental Hospital's staff by the way)
1955 Kildimo/Pallaskenry won City Junior football final, beat Claughaun 0-3 to 0-2.
1956 Kildimo/Pallaskenry won City Junior hurling final, beat St Patricks 2-7 to 2-4.
1958 Kildimo/Pallaskenry won City Junior hurling final, beat Ballybrown in replay.
1959 After Incident in match against Ballybrown, Kildimo/Pallaskenry suspended for five years.
1965 Kildimo/Pallaskenry back in action, but to no avail.
1971 Parted from Kildimo- Pallaskenry back on own in West, Kildimo in City Division.
1980 Pallaskenry field officially purchased.
1986 Pallaskenry Bord na nÓg formed.
1987 First underage title, City U13 football win over Ballybrown.
1989 First underage hurling title, City U12 hurling win over Corpus Christi.
1992 First County final at any age in 80 years, lost U14 football to Bruree.
1992 Lost U16 County hurling final to Ballybricken.
1994 First County championship win ever, Minor football win over Banogue.
1995 City Junior B football final, lost to Kildimo after replay.
1996 Won City U21 B football championship beat St. Patricks Ð lost county semi final to Knockainey.
1997 First competitive adult trophy, won City Junior B Hurling League against Monaleen.
1997 Won City hurling League Cup Final against Na Piarsaigh.
1997 Lost County Junior B Hurling semi final to Cappamore.
1998 Second ever County title, U16 football win over Banogue.
2001 First championship title Ð City Junior B Football win over St. Patricks.
2001 Lost County Junior B football quarter final to Castlemahon.
2002 Lost City Junior B Hurling Championship Final to Monaleen.
2002 Lost County Junior B Hurling Championship quarter final to Camogue Rovers.
2006 Won City Junior B Hurling Championship against Mungret.
2006 Merged with Kildimo, won Minor County Football Championship, Division 1.
2008 U21 Hurlers beaten by Blackrock in County Final
2006 Won City Junior B Hurling C'Ship defeating Mungret by 2-7 to 0-9.
2007 Won City Junior B Hurling C'Ship once more defeating Mungret by 1-8 to 0-10.
2008 Won City Junior B Hurling C'Ship defeating Claughaun by 0-9 to 1-5.
2015 After a very successful playing merger with Kildimo, consisting of 10 years at underage level and 4 years at adult level, playing as Kildimo-Pallaskenry, overwhelming majorities at EGMs in both clubs vote in favour of formally disbanding the clubs and to form a brand new club named Kildimo-Pallaskenry.
2017 Kildimo-Pallaskenry win the Limerick Intermediate Hurling Championship beating Glenroe in the final in Fitzgerald Park, Kilmallock
2018 The club makes its debut season in the Limerick Premier Intermediate Hurling Championship, ending the season as beaten semi finalists and finishing 2nd in the 8 team group stage.
2019 Kildimo-Pallaskenry qualify for the Premier Intermediate Hurling Championship Final at the second attempt, topping the group and subsequently beating Bruff in the semi final (after extra time). They will play Blackrock in the final on Sunday 6 October 2019 at the LIT Gaelic Grounds in Limerick with a 1.45pm throw in.

References

External links
Official Pallaskenry GAA Club website

Gaelic games clubs in County Limerick
Hurling clubs in County Limerick
Gaelic football clubs in County Limerick